Vaugines is a commune in the Vaucluse department in the Provence-Alpes-Côte d'Azur region in southeastern France.

It lies on the southern slopes of the Luberon Massif. It is a very old and isolated village.

Vaugines has preserved its Provençal style, with its peaceful decorated lanes of traditional stone rural houses. The countryside surrounding Vaugines is wild and typical of Provence, and was chosen by film director Claude Berri for the filming of parts of his adaptions of Marcel Pagnol's novels Jean de Florette and Manon des Sources.

See also
 Côtes du Luberon AOC
Communes of the Vaucluse department

References

Communes of Vaucluse